Ashley Nicole Iaconetti Haibon (born March 6, 1988) is an American television personality and journalist notable for being a contestant on several series in The Bachelor television franchise, including The Bachelor, Bachelor in Paradise and The Bachelor Winter Games.

Early life and education 
Iaconetti Haibon was born on March 6, 1988, in Great Falls, Virginia. She is of Italian, Dutch and Lithuanian descent. Iaconetti Haibon attended Langley High School and James Madison University. She later earned a master's degree in broadcasting and digital journalism from Syracuse University.

Career

The Bachelor franchise 
In 2015, Iaconetti Haibon appeared in season 19 of The Bachelor.
She shared her season with another contestant named Ashley, Ashley Salter, leading to her nickname of "Ashley I" to distinguish the two. The nickname has persisted beyond the show, and is used in other contexts such as the name of one of her podcasts.

Iaconetti Haibon later appeared in season two and three of Bachelor in Paradise. 

In 2018, Iaconetti Haibon appeared in the first season of The Bachelor Winter Games. Iaconetti Haibon and Kevin Wendt became the first winners of the Bachelor Winter Games and left the show as a couple.

Journalism 
Iaconetti Haibon is a correspondent for Access Hollywood and ClevverTV.

Iaconetti Haibon is a contributor for Cosmopolitan. She also co-hosts The Ben and Ashley I Almost Famous Podcast with Ben Higgins and the I Don't Get It podcast, along with former Bachelor and Bachelorette producer Naz Perez and her sister, Lauren Iaconetti.

Personal life 
In March 2018, Iaconetti Haibon started dating Bachelor in Paradise castmate Jared Haibon after reconciling at Jade Roper Tolbert and Tanner Tolbert's wedding. They got engaged in June 2018 in Sayulita, Mexico, on Season 5 of Bachelor in Paradise. They live together in Rhode Island. On August 11, 2019, they married at the Rosecliff Mansion in Newport, Rhode Island. Their son was born in January 2022.

Filmography

Television

Discography

Music videos

References

External links 
 

1988 births
Living people
People from Great Falls, Virginia
James Madison University alumni
Syracuse University alumni
Bachelor Nation contestants
American people of Italian descent
American people of Dutch descent
American people of Lithuanian descent
Social media influencers